Kris Marcus Bruton (born January 10, 1971) is an American professional basketball player. Drafted by the Chicago Bulls in the second round of the 1994 NBA Draft, he was with the Bulls for two pre-seasons (1994 and 1995) before a serious thigh injury ended his career.  Bruton never appeared in a regular-season NBA game for the Bulls. After recuperating, he was recruited by the Harlem Globetrotters, carving a niche on the court as a slam dunk expert.

Pre-professional career
Born in Greer, South Carolina, Bruton played very little high school basketball. A number of injuries kept him off the court for most of his four years at the local school. After graduating, Bruton enrolled at Benedict College in Columbia, South Carolina, but did not pursue a position on the school's basketball team. Only after a pick-up game in the school gymnasium was he recruited by the team's coach and offered an athletic scholarship.

Bruton was selected for NAIA First Team All-American honors as a senior for the 1993–1994 season. That year, he averaged 20.4 points and ten rebounds per game, while completing 231 of 380 shots. He also won the Slam Dunk Contest during the 1994 NCAA Final Four Weekend in Charlotte, North Carolina, and again in New Orleans, Louisiana in 2003.

Professional career
Following his graduation from Benedict College, Bruton was drafted by the Chicago Bulls in the second round of the 1994 NBA Draft. The 49th pick overall, he was a pre-season cut in both 1994 and 1995 before a thigh injury ended his NBA career. Shortly after, he traveled overseas to play in Nagoya, Japan, where he played for two years before returning to the United States and playing in the semi-professional Continental Basketball Association. Three years later, he would return overseas playing in France and Cyprus.
 
Bruton returned to his hometown after his tours in Europe. He joined the National Basketball Development League in Greenville, South Carolina, playing under Milton Barnes. Barnes was also serving as a coach for the Globetrotters and arranged a meeting between Bruton and other Globetrotters' staff after observing his play. An agreement was reached shortly thereafter, and Bruton played his first game with the Globetrotters in December 2001. His unique jumping abilities made him an early crowd favorite.

During a tour of the Bahamas, Bruton and several other Globetrotters attempted to break the world record for highest slam dunk. While eyewitnesses allege that he successfully completed a dunk at 12'1", thus breaking the record, on-site judges declared it an illegal dunk.

References

External links
 The Original Harlem Globetrotters

1971 births
Living people
African-American basketball players
Basketball players from South Carolina
Benedict Tigers men's basketball players
Centers (basketball)
Chicago Bulls draft picks
Harlem Globetrotters players
American men's basketball players
People from Greer, South Carolina
Expatriate sportspeople in Japan
American expatriate basketball people in Japan
21st-century African-American sportspeople
20th-century African-American sportspeople